Deon Mouton (born 20 November 1974 in Rehoboth) is a Namibian rugby union Wing(rugby union)|wing. He is a member of the Namibia national rugby union team and participated with the squad at the 2007 Rugby World Cup.

References

1974 births
Living people
People from Rehoboth, Namibia
Rugby union scrum-halves
Namibian rugby union players
Namibia international rugby union players